Bodegas Pomar is an Empresas Polar subsidiary that makes still and sparkling wine.  The company also set a joint venture with the French cognac manufacturer Martell and its headquarters are located in Carora, Lara, Venezuela.  Their vineyards are located in Altagracia, Lara and enclose 80 hectares.

References

External links
 Bodegas Pomar - Bodega vitivinícola venezolana subsidiaria de las Empresas Polar dedicadas a la producción de vinos, sangrías y espumantes 

Food and drink companies of Venezuela
Drink companies of Venezuela
Companies established in 1985
1985 establishments in Venezuela
Venezuelan brands